My Kontrabida Girl (My Antagonist Girl or My Villain Girl) is a 2012 Filipino romantic comedy film written and directed by Jade Castro. It stars Rhian Ramos, Aljur Abrenica, Bea Binene and Jake Vargas. This movie was produced by GMA Pictures.

The film's story centers on the life of a famous soap opera antagonist and her funny and heart-warming quest in finding her one true love.

Plot

Isabel Reyes (Rhian Ramos) is an infamous soap opera villain in the country. Everyone simply loathes Isabel which makes her the most condemned personality in the world of television.

But by some weird twist of fate, Isabel’s life turns upside down when she encounters a near-death accident. The wicked antagonist experiences a sudden change of heart and being the top kontrabida of her soap opera, Isabel couldn’t just deliver her heartlessness and cruelty in front of the camera. Her over-the-top villainous persona disappears and she finds herself powerless to kick and slap the lead star.

Isabel’s show hits a major ratings slump and the network advises her to take a break from work with hopes of reigniting her passion. To solve her dilemma, Isabel seeks the help of the biggest kontrabida icon in the country, no less than Ms. Bella Flores. She finds her on YouTube and says that for Isabel to get herself back, she needs to find the person who hurt her the most. And that person for Isabel is Chris Bernal (Aljur Abrenica).

Armed with pure wits and sheer determination, Isabel sets off to meet Chris who is still living in the same town where she left him many years back when she was a child. As they navigate their way through romance and heartbreak, will it further sabotage Isabel’s career and their chances for a relationship?

As they rediscover their past, Isabel begins to see Chris in a new light and she unexpectedly finds herself falling in love all over again with the very same guy who broke her heart. Will they ever get the right timing to be together? Will the Kontrabida girl find the perfect and genuine love she has been wishing for in the arms of Chris?

Cast characters

Main cast
 Rhian Ramos as Isabel Reyes
 Aljur Abrenica as Chris Bernal
 Bea Binene as Joyce Bernal
 Jake Vargas as Poy

Supporting cast
 Chariz Solomon as Charity
 Gwen Zamora as herself
 Bela Padilla as Evelyn
 Enzo Pineda as Enzo
 Ken Chan as JC
 Kevin Santos as Kevin
 Sef Cadayona as Dex
 Odette Khan as Aunt Marot
 Sabina Santiago

Special participation
 Jeanie Rose L. Tolin 
 Bianca Umali
 Julie Anne San Jose
 Cherie Gil 
 Bella Flores 
 Celia Rodriguez
 Gladys Reyes 
 Louise delos Reyes
 Lolit Solis
 Tiya Pusit
 Jason Abalos 
 Jessa Mae T. Tejada
 Nardelyn C. Aguilar

Theme song
 The movie theme song "Ang Aking Puso" (My Heart) is composed by Janno Gibbs (and also included to his album "ORIG" under GMA Records) and sung by tween stars Julie Anne San Jose and Derrick Monasterio.

Release

Local release
The film was released in Philippine theaters nationwide on March 14, 2012, and had a total of 3 weeks of screen time in these theaters.

International release
The lead stars, Rhian Ramos and Aljur Abrenica, in their appearance in a Philippine Independence Day celebration in San Diego, CA, hinted that the movie might be screened internationally, making it the 2nd Filipino film to be commercially released in cinemas abroad, following GMA Films' The Road, although no confirmations have been made by the management of GMA Network nor its distribution partner, Freestyle Releasing.

Critical response
The Cinema Evaluation Board gave My Kontrabida Girl a grade of B. It received mixed to negative reviews from local movie critics. Rito Asilo of Philippine Daily Inquirer mentions the movie's flaws but admits audiences can "have a hearty laugh." Abby Mendoza of Philippine Entertainment Portal commented that My Kontrabida Girl is a better comedy than it is a romantic film but its really confused when it comes to another scenes.

Box office
According to Box Office Mojo, My Kontrabida Girl's opening week gross amounted to P6.7 million nationwide. At the end of its third week, the movie's total gross amounted to US$743,991 nationwide.

References

External links
GMA Network official website
GMA Network Official Facebook Page

GMA Pictures films
2012 films
2010s Tagalog-language films
2010s English-language films
Philippine romance films
2012 romance films
2012 multilingual films
Philippine multilingual films
Films directed by Jade Castro